Nikolay Nikolayevich Komlichenko (born 29 June 1995) is a Russian professional football player who plays as a striker for  Rostov and the Russia national team.

Club career
On 17 March 2014, Komlichenko made his debut in the Russian Premier League for Krasnodar in a game against Tom Tomsk.

After playing for the Czech club Mladá Boleslav on loan for 1.5 years, he moved to the club on a permanent basis on 30 January 2019, signing a 3.5-year contract. He became the top scorer of the Czech First League in the 2018–19 season with 29 goals.

On 25 January 2020, he signed a 4.5-year contract with Russian Premier League club FC Dynamo Moscow. In his first game for Dynamo on 29 February 2020 against Spartak Moscow, he came on as a second-half substitute and two of his shots hit the goalpost and the cross-bar as Dynamo lost 2–0. In the next game on 7 March 2020 against FC Tambov he started and scored the only goal of the game in a 1–0 victory. He was voted player of the month by Dynamo fans for February/March 2020 (only one game was played in February after the winter break and Russian Premier League was suspended on 17 March due to COVID-19 pandemic in Russia).

On 11 June 2021, Komlichenko joined FC Rostov on loan with an option to purchase. On 10 July 2022, he moved to Rostov on a permanent basis and signed a four-year contract.

International career
Komlichenko was first called up to Russia national team for UEFA Euro 2020 qualifying matches against San Marino and Cyprus in June 2019, however, he did not appear. He made his debut on 10 October 2019 in a Euro qualifier against Scotland. He substituted Artyom Dzyuba (who scored twice in the game) in the 86th minute.

He scored his first national team goal on 19 November 2019 in a qualifier against San Marino.

Personal life
His father, also called Nikolay, played football professionally.

Career statistics

Club

International

Scores and results list Russia's goal tally first, score column indicates score after each Komlichenko goal.

Honours
 Russian Professional Football League Zone South Top Goalscorer: 2015–16 (24 goals)
 Russian Professional Football League Zone South Best Player: 2015–16
 Czech First League Top Goalscorer: 2018–19 (29 goals)
 Czech First League Best Foreign Player: 2018–19

References

External links
 
 

Living people
1995 births
People from Dinskoy District
Russian people of Ukrainian descent
Sportspeople from Krasnodar Krai
Russian footballers
Association football forwards
Russia international footballers
Russia under-21 international footballers
Russia youth international footballers
Russian Second League players
Russian Premier League players
Czech First League players
FC Krasnodar players
FC Krasnodar-2 players
FC Chernomorets Novorossiysk players
FC Slovan Liberec players
FK Mladá Boleslav players
FC Dynamo Moscow players
FC Rostov players
Russian expatriate footballers
Russian expatriate sportspeople in the Czech Republic
Expatriate footballers in the Czech Republic